General Sir Herbert Edward Blumberg,  (20 March 1869 – 16 August 1934) was a Royal Marines officer who served as Adjutant-General Royal Marines.

Military career
Blumberg was commissioned into the Royal Marine Light Infantry on 1 February 1888. He served as Deputy Assistant Adjutant-General at Headquarters, Royal Marine Forces from October 1911 and as Assistant Adjutant-General at Headquarters, Royal Marine Forces from June 1916 during the First World War. He went on to be Adjutant-General Royal Marines in December 1920 before retiring in March 1924.

Works

References

1869 births
1934 deaths
Knights Commander of the Order of the Bath
Royal Marines generals
Royal Marines personnel of World War I